Pitsusköngäs (also spelled Pihtsusköngäs,), also known as the "Niagara of Finland" or the "King of Finnish waterfalls" is the largest waterfall in all of Finland. It is accessible by following the Nordkalottleden Trail, an 800 kilometer hiking route than runs through Finland, Sweden and Norway.

References

External links 

Waterfalls of Finland
Torne river basin
Landforms of Lapland (Finland)